Middlesex County Cricket Club is one of eighteen first-class county clubs within the domestic cricket structure of England and Wales. It represents the historic county of Middlesex which has effectively been subsumed within the ceremonial county of Greater London. The club was founded in 1864 but teams representing the county have played top-class cricket since the early 18th century and the club has always held first-class status. Middlesex have competed in the County Championship since the official start of the competition in 1890 and have played in every top-level domestic cricket competition in England.

The club plays most of its home games at Lord's Cricket Ground, which is owned by Marylebone Cricket Club, in St John's Wood. The club also plays some games at the Uxbridge Cricket Club Ground (historically Middlesex) and the Old Deer Park in Richmond (historically Surrey). Until October 2014, the club played limited overs cricket as the Middlesex Panthers, having changed from Middlesex Crusaders in 2009 following complaints from Muslims and Jews. On 24 October 2014, the club announced that they would use the name Middlesex County Cricket Club in all forms of the sport with immediate effect. Limited-overs kit colours are dark blue and pink quarters and from 2007, Middlesex have worn exclusive pink shirts during their Twenty20 matches in support of the Breakthrough Breast Cancer charity. The club has an indoor school based in Finchley, the Middlesex Academy and a project at Radlett Cricket Club.

Middlesex have won thirteen County Championship titles (including 2 shared titles), the most recent in 2016. In limited overs cricket, they have won two Benson & Hedges Cups, four one-day cricket titles, one National League and the Twenty20 Cup, through which they became the first county club to qualify for both the Stanford Super Series and the Twenty20 Champions League.

Honours

First XI honours
 Champion County (1) – 1866
 County Championship (11) – 1903, 1920, 1921, 1947, 1976, 1980, 1982, 1985, 1990, 1993, 2016; shared (2) – 1949, 1977
Division Two (1): 2011
 FP Trophy (4) – 1977, 1980, 1984, 1988
 National League (1) – 1992
Division Two (1): 2004
 Twenty20 Cup (1) – 2008
 Benson & Hedges Cup (2) – 1983, 1986

Second XI honours
 Second XI Championship (5) – 1974, 1989, 1993, 1999, 2000; shared (1) – 2013
 Second XI Trophy (2) – 2007, 2018
 Second XI T20 (2) – 2015, 2016
 Minor Counties Championship (1) – 1935

History

Earliest cricket
It is almost certain that cricket reached London, and thereby Middlesex, by the 16th century. Early references to the game in London or Middlesex are often interchangeable and sometimes it is not clear if a particular team represents the city or the county.

See: History of cricket to 1696 and History of cricket 1697 - 1725

The first definite mention of cricket in London or Middlesex dates from 1680. It is a clear reference to "the two umpires" (the earliest mention of an umpire in what seems to be a cricket connection) and strongly suggests that the double wicket form of the game was already well known in London.

The earliest known match in Middlesex took place at Lamb's Conduit Fields in Holborn on 3 July 1707 involving teams from London and Croydon. In 1718, the first reference is found to White Conduit Fields in Islington, which later became a very famous London venue.

The earliest known reference to a team called Middlesex is on 5 August 1728 when it played London Cricket Club "in the fields behind the Woolpack, in Islington, near Sadlers Wells, for £50 a side". This was also the earliest known match involving a Middlesex team.

For information about Middlesex county teams before the formation of Middlesex CCC, see: Middlesex county cricket teams

Origin of club
There are references to earlier county organisations, especially the MCC Thursday Club around 1800, but the definitive Middlesex club is the present Middlesex CCC. The club was informally founded on 15 December 1863 at a meeting in the London Tavern. Formal constitution took place on 2 February 1864. The creation of the club was largely through the efforts of the Walker family of Southgate, which included several notable players including the famous V. E. Walker, who in 1859 became the first player to take 10 wickets in an innings and score a century in the same match.

Early history
Middlesex CCC played its initial first-class match versus Sussex CCC at Islington on 6 & 7 June 1864. In the same season, the club was a contender for the title of "Champion County". Middlesex played at Lillie Bridge Grounds from 1869 before leaving in 1872 due to the poor quality of the turf. The club nearly folded at this time, a vote for continuing being won 7–6. They played at Prince's Cricket Ground from 1872 to 1876, and began using Lord's Cricket Ground in 1877.

20th century
The club has produced several noted players, particularly the great batsmen Patsy Hendren, Bill Edrich and Denis Compton.

Bill Edrich scored 1,000 runs before the end of May in 1938. He needed just 15 innings, with 4 centuries, and every run was scored at Lord's. Don Bradman gave him the chance to score the 10 runs he needed in the Australian tour match with Middlesex by declaring his team's innings early.

Middlesex won the County Championship in 1947 thanks to the unprecedented run scoring of Compton and Edrich. They both passed Tom Hayward's 1906 record of 3,518 runs in a season with Compton making 3,816 at 90.86 and Edrich 3,539 at 80.43 with a dozen centuries. Compton's 18 centuries surpassed Jack Hobbs' former record of 16, set in 1925. Together with Jack Robertson's 2,214 runs and Syd Brown's 1,709 and the bowling of Jack Young, Jim Sims, Laurie Gray and Compton and Edrich themselves, the championship was won. The following season Compton and Edrich made their record unbeaten stand of 424 for the 3rd wicket against Somerset at Lords.

Middlesex's most successful period coincided with the captaincies of Mike Brearley and Mike Gatting from 1971 to 1997. Brearley proved as astute for his county as he did for his country between 1971 and 1982. His team included Gatting and England spin bowlers John Emburey and Phil Edmonds, and overseas fast bowlers such as Wayne Daniel.

Recent history
In 2007 Middlesex had mixed fortunes in Domestic Cricket. In the 4-Day version of the game, the club finished 3rd of the nine teams in Division 2 of the Liverpool Victoria County Championship, narrowly missing out on promotion. However, 3rd place in Division 2 of the NatWest Pro 40 League was enough to earn them a place in the play-off final against Northamptonshire Steelbacks. Middlesex won that game comfortably and therefore gained promotion to Division 1 for the 2008 Season. There was less success in the two knockout cups where Middlesex failed to progress beyond the group stages of either tournament. In the Friends Provident Trophy they finished 7th of the ten teams in the Southern Division. Likewise in the Twenty20 Cup, 5th place of the six teams in the Southern Division was not good enough to see them progress.

In 2008, Middlesex won the Twenty20 Cup by beating Kent in the final at The Rose Bowl. As well as being the club's first major trophy for 15 seasons, the final was also memorable for Middlesex's record breaking 187/6 (the highest ever Twenty20 Cup Finals Day score) with Kent's retort of 184/5 (being second on the all-time list) and ensured that the Cup was decided on the last ball of the match. The victory is also made historic as Middlesex became the first County Cricket Club to gain entry to both the Twenty20 Champions League and the Stanford Super Series.

However 2008 also saw Middlesex suffer relegation in the Pro40 Division One (finishing in last place). And in a copy of their final standings from the previous season, Middlesex both failed to make it past the group stage in the Friends Provident Trophy and finished in 3rd place in the County Championship Division Two, again missing out on promotion by just one position.

It was announced in February 2009 that Middlesex changed their limited overs name from the Middlesex Crusaders, to the Middlesex Panthers, following complaints made by Muslim and Jewish communities. On 24 October 2014, the club announced that the limited overs name will revert to Middlesex County Cricket Club (Middlesex CCC), with immediate effect.

2011 saw a dramatic improvement in form for Middlesex, as they won the LV= County Championship Division Two for the first time in their history, sealing promotion to Division One for the 2012 season. They narrowly missed out on a place in the CB40 semi-finals, after coming joint top of their group with the Sussex Sharks, missing out only via net run-rate.

In 2016, Middlesex were unbeaten in the County Championship and secured the title on the final day of the season when they defeated one of their main challengers Yorkshire in the title decider at Lord's. A defeat for Middlesex in that match would have meant the title going to Yorkshire and a draw would have meant it going to Somerset.

The following season, 2017, Middlesex finished in the bottom two of the County Championship and were subsequently relegated down to the second Division.  In 2022 they secured promotion back to the top flight of the County Championship on the penultimate day of the season by finishing runners up to Nottinghamshire in Division two.

Sponsorship

Records

First-class

Team records
 Highest total for – 676–5 declared v. Sussex, Hove, 2021
 Highest total against – 850–7 declared by Somerset, Taunton, 2007
 Lowest total for – 20 v. MCC, Lord's, 1864
 Lowest total against – 31 by Gloucestershire, Bristol, 1924

Batting records
 Highest score – 331 J. D. B. Robertson v. Worcestershire, Worcester, 1949
 Highest score against – 341 C. M. Spearman for Gloucestershire, Gloucester, 2004
 Most runs in season – 2,669 E. H. Hendren, 1923

Most runs for Middlesex 
Qualification – 20,000 runs

Bowling records
 Best bowling – 10–40 G. O. B. Allen v. Lancashire, Lord's, 1929
 Best bowling against – 9–38 R. C. Robertson-Glasgow for Somerset, Lord's, 1924
 Best match bowling 
16–114 G. Burton v. Yorkshire, Bramall Lane, Sheffield, 1888 
16–114 J. T. Hearne v. Lancashire, Old Trafford, Manchester, 1898
 Best match bowling against – 16–100 J. E. B. B. P. Q. C. Dwyer for Sussex, Hove, 1906
 Wickets in season – 158 F. J. Titmus, 1955

Most wickets for Middlesex 
Qualification – 1,000 wickets

Wicket-keeping records

Most dismissals for Middlesex 
Qualification – 500 dismissals

Best partnership for each wicket

*  – Indicates that the partnership was unbroken

List A

Team records
 Highest total for – 380–5 (50 overs) v. Kent, Canterbury, 2019
 Highest total against – 367–6 (50 overs) by Sussex, Hove, 2015
 Lowest total for – 23 (32 overs) v. Yorkshire, Leeds, 1974
 Lowest total against – 41 (19.4 overs) by Northamptonshire, Northampton, 1972

Batting records
 Highest score – 182, S.S. Eskenazi, Radlett, 2022
 Highest score against – 163 C. J. Adams for Sussex, Arundel, 1999

Bowling records

 Best bowling for – 7–12 W. W. Daniel v. Minor Counties East, Ipswich, 1978
 Best bowling against – 6–28 A. W. Greig for Sussex, Hove, 1971

Best partnership for each wicket
 1st – 210* Paul Weekes & Ed Smith v. Northumberland, Jesmond, 2005
 2nd – 268 Dawid Malan & Nick Gubbins v. Sussex, Hove, 2015
 3rd – 165 Mark Ramprakash & John Carr v. Nottinghamshire, Lord's, 1993
 4th – 220 Ed Joyce & Jamie Dalrymple v. Glamorgan, Lord's, 2004
 5th – 147 Mark Ramprakash & John Carr  v. Leicestershire, Leicester, 1992
 6th – 142* Ben Hutton & Nick Compton v. Lancashire, Shenley, 2002
 7th – 132 Keith Brown & N. F. Williams v. Somerset, Lord's, 1988
 8th – 112 David Nash & A. A. Noffke v. Sussex, Lord's, 2002
 9th – 73 David Nash & Angus Fraser v. Northamptonshire, Lord's, 1999
 10th – 57* Eoin Morgan & Mohammad Ali v. Somerset, Bath, 2006

* Denotes not out/unbroken partnership

Club captains

Current squad
The Middlesex squad for the 2023 season consists of:

 No. denotes the player's squad number, as worn on the back of their shirt.
  denotes players with international caps.
  denotes a player who has been awarded a county cap.

Source:

Officers

Club presidents

Club chairmen

Board of Directors

Officers

 President: Mike Selvey 
 Chair: Mike O'Farrell
 Treasurer: David Kendix
 CEO: Andrew Cornish 
 CFO: Illa Bhardwaj

Directors

Staff

Club secretaries

Chief executive officers
 Vinny Codrington 1997–2015
 Richard Goatley 2015-2021
 Andrew Cornish 2021 to date

Chief financial officers
 Illa Bhardwaj 2021 to date

Directors of cricket
 Alan Coleman 2022 to date

Managing directors of cricket
 Angus Fraser 2009-2021

Club coaches

Club scorers

See also

References

Notes

Bibliography
 Harry Altham, A History of Cricket, Volume 1 (to 1914), George Allen & Unwin, 1962
 Derek Birley, A Social History of English Cricket, Aurum, 1999
 Rowland Bowen, Cricket: A History of its Growth and Development, Eyre & Spottiswoode, 1970
 Roy Webber, The Playfair Book of Cricket Records, Playfair Books, 1951
 Playfair Cricket Annual – various editions
 Wisden Cricketers' Almanack – various editions

External links
 Middlesex County Cricket Club
 Brooks Macdonald sign a three year sponsorship agreement with Middlesex
 Dave Houghton's batting analysis
 ESPN Cricinfo
 Middlesex Cricket Archive

Middlesex County Cricket Club
Cricket clubs established in 1864
English first-class cricket teams
Cricket teams in London
1864 establishments in England